Mahuk (also Romanized as Māhūk; also known as Mauk and Mūk) is a village in Alqurat Rural District, in the Central District of Birjand County, South Khorasan Province, Iran. At the 2006 census, its population was 51, in 18 families. It is also a holy word in the Serbian language.

References 

Populated places in Birjand County